The Mikoyan MiG-31 (NATO reporting name: Foxhound) is a supersonic interceptor aircraft  developed for the Soviet Air Forces by the Mikoyan design bureau as a replacement for the earlier MiG-25 "Foxbat"; the MiG-31 is based on and shares design elements with the MiG-25.

The MiG-31 is among the fastest combat jets in the world. It continues to be operated by the Russian and Kazakh Air Forces following the end of the Cold War and the collapse of the Soviet Union in 1991. The Russian Defence Ministry expects the MiG-31 to remain in service until 2030 or beyond; that was confirmed in 2020 when an announcement was made to extend the service lifetime of the existing airframes from 2,500 to 3,500 hours.

Development

Background 
The single-seat MiG-25 could achieve high speed, altitude and rate of climb; however, it lacked maneuverability at interception speeds and was difficult to fly at low altitudes. The MiG-25's speed was normally limited to Mach 2.83, but it could reach a maximum speed of Mach 3.2 or more with the risk of engine damage.

Development of the MiG-25's replacement began with the Ye-155MP prototype which first flew on 16 September 1975. Although it bore a superficial resemblance to the MiG-25, it had a longer fuselage to accommodate the radar operator's cockpit and was in many respects a new design. An important development was the MiG-31's advanced radar, capable of both look-up and look-down/shoot-down engagement, as well as multiple target tracking. This gave the Soviet Union an interceptor with the capability to engage the most likely Western intruders (low-flying cruise missiles and bombers) at long range. The MiG-31 replaced the Tu-128 as the Soviet Union's dedicated long-range interceptor, with far more advanced sensors and weapons, while its range is almost double that of the MiG-25.

Like that of its MiG-25 predecessor, the introduction of the MiG-31 was surrounded by early speculation and misinformation concerning its design and abilities. The West learned of the new interceptor from Lieutenant Viktor Belenko, a pilot who defected to Japan in 1976 with his MiG-25P. Belenko described an upcoming "Super Foxbat" with two seats and an ability to intercept cruise missiles. According to his testimony, the new interceptor was to have air intakes similar to the Mikoyan-Gurevich MiG-23, which the MiG-31 does not have, at least in production variants.

Production 
Serial production of the MiG-31 began in 1979. The first production batch of 519 MiG-31s including 349 "baseline models" was produced at the Sokol plant between 1976 and 1988. The second batch of 101 MiG-31DZs was produced from 1989 to 1991. The final batch of 69 MiG-31B aircraft was produced between 1990 and 1994. From the final batch 50 were retained by the Kazakhstan Air Force after the dissolution of the Soviet Union. Of the "baseline models", 40 airframes were upgraded to MiG-31BS standard.

MiG-31 production ended in 1994.

Upgrades and replacement 
Some upgrade programs have found their way into the MiG-31 fleet, like the MiG-31BM multirole version with upgraded avionics, new multimode radar, hands-on-throttle-and-stick (HOTAS) controls, liquid crystal (LCD) color multi-function displays (MFDs), ability to carry the R-77 missile and various Russian air-to-ground missiles (AGMs) such as the Kh-31 anti-radiation missile (ARM), a new and more powerful computer, and digital data links. A project to upgrade the Russian MiG-31 fleet to the MiG-31BM standard began in 2010; 100 aircraft are to be upgraded to MiG-31BM standard by 2020. Russian Federation Defence Ministry chief Colonel Yuri Balyko has claimed that the upgrade will increase the combat effectiveness of the aircraft several times over. 18 MIG-31BMs were delivered in 2014. The Russian military will receive more than 130 upgraded MiG-31BMs, and the first 24 aircraft have already been delivered, Russian Deputy Defense Minister Yuri Borisov told reporters on 9 April 2015.

Russia plans to start development of a replacement for the MiG-31 by 2019. The aircraft will be called PAK-DP (ПАК ДП, Перспективный авиационный комплекс дальнего перехвата – Prospective Air Complex for Long-Range Interception). Development of the new aircraft, designated MiG-41, began in April 2013. Such development is favored over restarting MiG-31 production. In March 2014, Russian test pilot Anatoly Kvochur said that work began on a Mach 4 capable MiG-41 based on the MiG-31. Later reports said that development of the MiG-31 replacement is to begin in 2017, with the first aircraft to be delivered in 2020, and the replacement entering service in 2025.

Design 

Like the MiG-25, the MiG-31 is a large twin-engine aircraft with side-mounted air intake ramps, a shoulder-mounted wing with an aspect ratio of 2.94, and twin vertical tailfins. Unlike the MiG-25, it has two seats, with the rear occupied by a dedicated weapon systems officer.

The MiG-31 was designed to fulfill the following mission objectives:
Intercept cruise missiles and their launch aircraft by reaching missile launch range in the shortest possible time after departing the loiter area;
Detect and destroy low flying cruise missiles, UAVs and helicopters;
Long range escort of strategic bombers;
Provide strategic air defense in areas not covered by ground-based air defense systems.

The MiG-31 is limited to five g when travelling at supersonic speeds. While flying under combat weight, its wing loading is marginal and its thrust-to-weight ratio is favorable. The MiG-31 is not designed for close combat or rapid turning.

The wings and airframe of the MiG-31 are stronger than those of the MiG-25, permitting supersonic flight at low altitudes. Like the MiG-25, its flight surfaces are built primarily of nickel-steel alloy, enabling the aircraft to tolerate kinetic heating at airspeeds approaching Mach 3. The MiG-31 airframe comprises 49% arc-welded nickel steel, 33% light metal alloy, 16% titanium and 2% composites. Its D30-F6 jet engines, each rated at 152 kN thrust, allow a maximum speed of Mach 1.23 at low altitude. High-altitude speed is temperature-redlined to Mach 2.83 – the thrust-to-drag ratio is sufficient for speeds in excess of Mach 3, but such speeds pose unacceptable hazards to engine and airframe life in routine use.

Electronics suite 

The MiG-31 was among the first aircraft with a phased array radar, and one of two aircraft in the world capable of independently firing long-range air-to-air missiles as of 2013.

The MiG-31 was the world's first operational fighter with a passive electronically scanned array (PESA) radar, the Zaslon S-800. The radar is matched with an infrared search and track (IRST) system in a retractable undernose fairing.

The MiG-31 was equipped with RK-RLDN and APD-518 digital secure datalinks. The RK-RLDN datalink is for communication with ground control centers. The APD-518 datalink enables a flight of four MiG-31 to automatically exchange radar-generated data within  from each other. It also enables other aircraft with less sophisticated avionics, such as MiG-23s, 25s, and 29s and Su-15s and 27s, to be directed to targets spotted by MiG-31 (a maximum of four (long-range) for each MiG-31 aircraft). The A-50 AEW aircraft and MiG-31 can automatically exchange aerial and terrestrial radar target designation, as well as air defense. The MiG-31 is equipped with ECM of radar and infrared ranges.

The flight-navigation equipment of the MiG-31 includes a complex of automatic control system SAU-155МP and sighting-navigation complex KN-25 with two inertial systems and IP-1-72A with digital computer, electronic long range navigation system Radical NP (312) or A-331, electronic system of the long-range navigation A-723. Distant radio navigation is carried out by means of two systems: Chayka (similar to the system of Loran) and «Route» (similar to the system of Omega).

Similarly to the complex S-300 missile system, aircraft group with APD-518 can share data obtained by various radars from different directions (active or passive scanning of radiation) and summarize the data. The target can be detected passively (via its emissions of jamming or use of its radar) and/or actively simultaneously from many different directions (with the MiG-31 using its radar). Every aircraft with the APD-518 will have the exact data, even if it is not involved in the search.

Radars 

Adopted in 1981 RP-31 N007 backstop (Russian: Zaslon).
 the range of detection of air targets with Zaslon-A:  (for the purpose of a radar cross-section of 19 m2 on a collision angle with probability 0.5)
 number of detected targets: 24 (was originally 10)
 number of targets for attack: 6 (was originally 4)
 range of automatic tracking: 
 detection of infrared signature targets: 
 Effective in the detection of cruise missiles and other targets against ground clutter
 Until 2000, it was the world's only fighter in service equipped with phased array radar, when the Mitsubishi F-2 entered service with the J/APG-1 active phased array radar.
 Able to intercept and destroy cruise missiles flying at extremely low altitudes.

Variant differences 
The basic differences between other versions and the MiG-31BM are:
The onboard radar complex of the MiG-31BM can track 24 airborne targets at one time, six of which can be simultaneously attacked by R-33S missiles.
Modernized variants of the aircraft can be equipped with anti-radiation missiles Kh-31, Kh-25MR or MPU (up to six units), anti-ship Kh-31A (up to six), air-to-surface class missiles Kh-29 and Kh-59 (up to three) or Kh-59M (up to two units), up to six precision bombs KAB-1500 or eight KAB-500 with television or laser-guidance.
The MiG-31M, MiG-31D, and MiG-31BM standard aircraft have an upgraded Zaslon-M radar, with larger antenna and greater detection range (said to be  against AWACS-size targets) and the ability to attack multiple targets  – air and ground – simultaneously. The Zaslon-M has a  diameter (larger) antenna, with 50–100% better performance than Zaslon. In April 1994 it was used with an R-37 to hit a target at  distance. Relative target speed detection increased from Mach 5 to Mach 6, improving the probability of destroying fast-moving targets. The MiG-31BM is one of only a few aircraft able to intercept and destroy cruise missiles flying at extremely low altitude.

Cockpit 

The aircraft is a two-seater with the rear seat occupant controlling the radar. Although cockpit controls are duplicated across cockpits, it is normal for the aircraft to be flown only from the front seat. The pilot flies the aircraft by means of a centre stick and left hand throttles. The rear cockpit has only two small vision ports on the sides of the canopy. The presence of the WSO (weapon systems operator) in the rear cockpit improves aircraft effectiveness since the WSO is entirely dedicated to radar operations and weapons deployment, thus decreasing the workload of the pilot and increasing efficiency. Both cockpits are fitted with zero/zero ejection seats which allow the crew to eject at any altitude and airspeed.

Armament 

The MiG-31's main armament is four R-33 air-to-air missiles (NATO codename AA-9 'Amos') carried under the belly. 
One GSh-6-23  cannon with 260 rounds. (The MiG-31's predecessor, the MiG-25 did not include a cannon.)
Fuselage recesses for four R-33 (AA-9 'Amos') or four R-37 (AA-13 'Arrow') (MiG-31M/BM only).
Four underwing pylons for a combination of (six places for charging (two spaces to add removable fuel tanks)
Six R-37 (missile) long-range air-to-air missiles .
Four R-33 long-range missiles  2012.
 (?)× Kh-31 long-range air-to-ground missiles for high-speed target (maneuvering with an overload of 8 g).
 (?)× R-33 (AA-9 "Amos") (1981) , R-33S (1999) .
Four R-60 (AA-8 'Aphid')
Four R-73 (AA-11 'Archer') short-range IR missiles,
Four R-77 (AA-12 'Adder') medium-range missiles for high-speed target (maneuvering with overload of 12 g).
Some aircraft are equipped to launch the Kh-31P (AS-17 'Krypton') and Kh-58 (AS-11 'Kilter') anti-radiation missiles in the Suppression of Enemy Air Defenses (SEAD) role. Anti-ship missiles Kh-31A (up to six) and air-to-surface missiles X-59 and X-29T (up to three) or X-59M (up to two units), up to six air bombs KAB-1500, or up to eight KAB-500 with a television or laser-guidance.
It can carry both conventional and nuclear warheads. This gave the MiG-31 long range strike capabilities for the first time, alongside its primary interceptor role.

Operational history 

Serial production of the MiG-31 began in 1979. The MiG-31 entered operational service with the Soviet Air Defence Forces (PVO) in 1981. It was the world's first aircraft with a phased array radar.

During the 2022 Russian invasion of Ukraine, MiG-31 aircraft have reportedly shot down several Ukrainian aircraft, mainly by utilising the long range R-37 air-to-air missile. By remaining at high speed and high altitude, MiG-31s have been able to operate virtually unopposed due to Ukraine's own fighters lacking range, speed, or altitude.

The R-37M has, since October 2022, been the main threat against the Ukrainian Air Force. The Ukrainian Air Force has a significant lack of fire-and-forget missiles. They relied on the R-27 missiles, both the R-27ER and R-27ET; the R-27ET's range is 60 miles. A Ukrainian pilot must illuminate a Russian aircraft with radar to guide the missile to the target. Russian pilots firing the active-radar, fire-and-forget R-77 give them the ability to launch their missiles and then take evasive action. Ukrainian pilots were forced to "exploit ground clutter and terrain-masking to get close enough to fire before being engaged". During the first three days of the war both sides lost aircraft. The Ukrainians replaced them with older airframes that were made flyable. However the Russian Air Force turned to the MiG-31 with the R-37M missile that has a range of 200 miles. Combined with the superior radar on the MiG-31, the Ukrainian Air Force has started losing more aircraft. A report by the Royal United Services Institute states that in October some six R-37Ms were being fired at the Ukrainian Air Force a day. Four MiG-31s were also deployed to Crimea. To avoid R-37M missiles, Ukraine has had to attempt to destroy MiG-31s while they are still on the ground, such as the attack on the Belbek airbase and an attempted drone attack in August.

Export 
In 1992 Russia offered the MiG-31 to Finland, which had a selection programme ongoing for a new fighter, but the offer was not submitted to the program, where Russia had submitted the MiG-29. Finland didn't take up the offer, and chose the new fighter from the selection programme.

Syria ordered eight MiG-31E aircraft in 2007 for the Syrian Air Force. The order was suspended in May 2009 reportedly either due to Israeli pressure or lack of Syrian funds.

Variants 

Ye-155MP (MiG-25MP) Prototype modification of the early MiG-31. First flight on 16 September 1975.

MiG-31 First variant which entered in serial production. 349 aircraft were built.

MiG-31MDevelopment of a more comprehensive advanced version, the MiG-31M, began in 1984 and first flew in 1985, but the dissolution of the Soviet Union prevented it from entering full production. One piece rounded windscreen, small side windows for rear cockpit, wider and deeper dorsal spine. Digital flight controls added, multifunction CRT cockpit displays, multi-mode phased array radar. No gun fitted in this model, refueling probe moved to starboard side of aircraft, fuselage weapon stations increased from 4 to 6 by adding two centre-line stations. Maximum TO weight increased to  using increased thrust D-30F6M engines instead of the D-30F6 engines. 1 prototype and 6 flyable pre-production units were produced.

MiG-31D Two aircraft were designated as Type 31D and were manufactured as dedicated anti-satellite models with ballast in the nose instead of radars, flat fuselage undersurface (i.e. no recessed weapon system bays) and had large winglets above and below the wing-tips. Equipped with Vympel ASAT missiles. Two prototypes were built.

MiG-31LL Special modification used as a flying laboratory for testing of ejection seats during flight.

MiG-31 01DZ Two-seat all weather, all altitude interceptor. Designated as MiG-31 01DZ when fitted with air-to-air refueling probe. One hundred produced of DZ variant.

MiG-31B Second production batch with upgraded avionics and in-flight refueling probe introduced in 1990. Its development was the result of the Soviet discovery that Phazotron radar division engineer Adolf Tolkachev had sold information on advanced radars to the West. A new version of the compromised radar was hastily developed. MiG-31B also have the improved ECM and EW equipment with integration of improved R-33S missiles. Long range navigation system compatible with Loran/Omega and Chaka ground stations added. This model replaced the 01DZ models in late 1990.

MiG-31E Export version of the MiG-31B with simplified avionics. Never entered in serial production.

MiG-31BS Designation applied to type 01DZ when converted to MiG-31B standard.

MiG-31BM After passing state testing in 2008 this modernized variant of MiG-31B was approved for introduction into air force of Russia. 50 planes are modified to MiG-31BM (Bolshaya Modernizatsiya/Big Modernization) standard in accordance with 2011 contract. Efficiency of modernized MiG-31BM is 2.6 times greater than basic MiG-31. It had the ability to automatically track up to ten targets, and the latest units can track up to 24 targets and simultaneously engage up to eight targets. The on-board Argon-K is replaced with new Baget 55-06 computer that selects four targets of highest priority, which simultaneously are engaged by long-range R-33S air-to-air missiles. MiG-31BM has multi-role capability as is capable of using anti-radar, air to ship and air to ground missiles. It has some of avionics unified with MiG-29SMT and has refueling probe.

MiG-31BSM An upgrade of the BS version, it is the latest modernization variant first time contracted in 2014 for modernization of 60 aircraft, it is very similar in some aspects to the BM standard. Unlike the BS standard, aircraft modernized into the BSM standard are equipped with air refueling probe. Furthermore, new faster central computer Baget-55-06 is used with addition of multi-functional displays, one for the pilot and three for the weapons operator-navigator. Also there is a new set of navigation equipment. The MiG-31BSM has multi-role capability with ability to use anti-radar, anti-ship and air-to-ground missiles. Main visible difference between the BS and BSM standards is adding of the rear-view periscope above the front cockpit canopy.

MiG-31K Modified MiG-31BM variant able to carry the hypersonic Kh-47M2 Kinzhal ALBM. Ten aircraft were modified by May 2018. With this modification and with removed APU for air-to-air missiles, the aircraft gained a sole role of an attack aircraft.

MiG-31F Planned fighter-bomber intended for use with TV, radar and laser-guided ASM weapon systems. Never entered serial production.

MiG-31FE Planned export version of the MiG-31F.

MiG-31 (Izdeliye 08) MiG-31 modified into a launch-platform for the Izdeliye 293 Burevestnik anti-satellite missile. At least two prototypes are converted. Tests from September 2018.

Operators 

 Kazakh Air Defense Forces 
 610th Air Base (Sary-Arka Airport)
 From 20 to 31 in inventory as of 2020.

 Russian Aerospace Forces
4th Centre for Combat Application and Crew Training (Savasleyka)
22nd Fighter Aviation Regiment (Tsentralnaya Uglovaya)
98th Independent Composite Aviation Regiment (Monchegorsk)
764th Fighter Aviation Regiment (Perm/Bolshoye Savino)
712th Guards Fighter Aviation Regiment (Kansk)
790th Fighter Aviation Regiment (Khotilovo/Borisovskiy)
929th V.P. Chkalova State Flight Test Centre (Akhtubinsk)
 From 131 to 85 MiG-31BM in inventory as of 2020. Deliveries of updated aircraft drawn from older models stocks continue as of 2022. Ten jets have been modified to the MiG-31K version and carry the Kh-47M2 Kinzhal missile as of May 2018. With this modification and with removed APU for air-to-air missiles, the aircraft gained a sole role of an attack aircraft.
 Russian Naval Aviation 
 7060th Naval Aviation Air Base (Petropavlovsk-Kamchatskiy/Yelizovo)
 10 MiG-31B/BS and 22 MiG-31BM in inventory as of 2020.

Former operators 

 Soviet Air Forces aircraft passed to the Russian and Kazakh Air Forces after the dissolution of the Soviet Union.
 Soviet Air Defence Forces

Notable accidents 
On 4 April 1984, a MiG-31 crashed while on a test flight, killing Mikoyan chief test pilot and Hero of the Soviet Union, Aleksandr Vasilyevich Fedotov and his navigator V. Zaitsev.

On 26 April 2017, a MiG-31 crashed after it was accidentally hit by "friendly fire" during a training session near the Telemba proving ground in Russian Far East. This occurred during a training exercise over the Telemba proving ground in Buryatia; both crew members ejected successfully. While Russian state media did not offer any details, independent investigators discovered from a leaked government document that the aircraft was shot down by an R-33 missile fired from another MiG-31 and that pilot error from both airplanes was at fault. The report also suggested problems with the Zaslon-AM radar and Baget-55 fire control system that might increase the risk of more accidental shootdowns.

On 16 April 2020, a MiG-31 interceptor of the Kazakh Air Force crashed in the country's Karaganda region.

On 8 April 2022, a MiG-31 of the Russian Air Force crashed in the Leningrad region.

On 2 December 2022, a MiG-31 of the Russian Air Force crashed during a training flight in the far eastern Primorsky Region.

Specifications (MiG-31)

See also

References

Notes

Bibliography

External links 

MiG-031
1970s Soviet fighter aircraft
Twinjets
Shoulder-wing aircraft
Aircraft first flown in 1975
Fourth-generation jet fighter